Allure is the debut studio album by American girl group Allure. It was released by Crave Records on May 6, 1997 in the United States.

Critical reception

Allmusic senior editor Stephen Thomas Erlewine found that executive producer Mariah "Carey's clout certainly helped Allure to line up celebrity collaborators [...] but it also meant that the album would be scrutinized in detail, which is unfair to any new vocal group. Allure do acquit themselves well on their debut, singing with passion and flair – it's clear they have talent. They are somewhat undone by inconsistent material, yet there are several instances where they make a song their own, and that's what makes Allure a promising debut."

Track listing

Notes
 denotes additional producer
 denotes co-producer

Sample credits
"Introduction" features a sample of "Let's Straighten it Out", as performed by Latimore.
"Anything You Want" features a sample of "Cry Together", as performed by The O'Jays.
"You're Gonna Love Me" features a sample of "The Look of Love" as performed by Isaac Hayes.
"Head Over Heels" features a sample of "The Bridge" as performed by MC Shan.
"No Question" features a sample of Juicy Fruit as performed by Mtume.
"When You Need Someone" features a sample of "Put it on the Line" as performed by James Brown and Lyn Collins.
"I'll Give You Anything" features a sample of "Ah Yeah" as performed by KRS-One.

Charts

Certifications

References

1997 debut albums
Albums produced by Cory Rooney
Allure (band) albums
Crave Records albums